The 1953 NCAA Men's Ice Hockey Tournament was the culmination of the 1952–53 NCAA men's ice hockey season, the sixth such tournament in NCAA history. It was held from March 12 to 14, 1953, and concluded with Michigan defeating Minnesota 7-3. All games were played at the Broadmoor Ice Palace in Colorado Springs, Colorado.

Michigan's win capped off its third consecutive National Championship. As of 2018 no team has been able to match that achievement. Additionally, their 14 goals in the semifinal game against Boston University were the most ever for an NCAA tournament game, matched only by Minnesota in 1954. The Wolverines' goal differential (+16) is also a record for an NCAA tournament, equaling the record set by Colorado College in 1950 and matched by Wisconsin in 1983.

For the first time since the tournament began the 'Most Outstanding Player' was awarded to someone from the championship team.

Qualifying teams
Four teams qualified for the tournament, two each from the eastern and western regions. The two best MCHL teams and a Tri-State League representative received bids into the tournament as did one independent school.

Format
The eastern team judged as better was seeded as the top eastern team while the MCHL champion was given the top western seed. The second eastern seed was slotted to play the top western seed and vice versa. All games were played at the Broadmoor Ice Palace. All matches were Single-game eliminations with the semifinal winners advancing to the national championship game and the losers playing in a consolation game.

Bracket

Note: * denotes overtime period(s)

Results

Semifinals

Minnesota vs. Rensselaer

Michigan vs. Boston University

Consolation Game

Boston University vs. Rensselaer

National Championship

Minnesota vs. Michigan

All-Tournament team

First Team
G: Jim Mattson (Minnesota)
D: Alex MacLellan (Michigan)
D: Tom Wegleitner (Minnesota)
F: John Matchefts* (Michigan)
F: Dick Meredith (Minnesota)
F: Abbie Moore (Rensselaer)
* Most Outstanding Player(s)

Second Team
G: Willard Ikola (Michigan)
D: Herb LaFontaine (Rensselaer)
D: Reggie Shave (Michigan)
F: John Mayasich (Minnesota)
F: George Chin (Michigan)
F: Frank Chiarelli (Rensselaer)

References

Tournament
NCAA Division I men's ice hockey tournament
NCAA Men's Ice Hockey Tournament
NCAA Men's Ice Hockey Tournament
1950s in Colorado Springs, Colorado
Ice hockey competitions in Colorado Springs, Colorado